Corruption is a 1983 American pornographic film written and directed by Roger Watkins under the pseudonym of Richard Mahler. The film, a loose adaptation of Richard Wagner's Das Rheingold, is about a group of shady businessmen seeking a mysterious briefcase which offers its owner untold power, on the condition that the owner renounce love.

Cast

Release 
The film was released in a Blu-ray + DVD combo pack by Vinegar Syndrome in 2016, along with the inclusion of Last House on Dead End Street, Watkins' non-pornographic debut feature, as a hidden feature.

Reception 
The reception to the film has been mostly positive. Cinema Blue called the film a "thinking man's porn", stating that "This is something different: this may challenge and provoke you, but it won't bore you, that's for sure". Writing for Blu-ray.com, Brian Orndorf called the film "artfully made and slightly unnerving", and compared the film positively to the works of David Lynch.

References

External links 

1983 films
American pornographic films
Films directed by Roger Watkins
1980s English-language films
1980s American films